Darrouzett High School or Darrouzett School is a public high school located in Darrouzett, Texas (USA). It is part of the Darrouzett Independent School District located in north central Lipscomb County near the Texas-Oklahoma border. Darrouzett recently added high school grades after being a K-6 school for over 10 years.  In 2015, the school was rated "Met Standard" by the Texas Education Agency.

Academics
Team Debate Champions - 
1951(B)

Athletics
The Darrouzett Longhorns compete in these sports - 

Cross Country, Golf, Basketball, Tennis and Track.

References

External links
Darrouzett ISD

Schools in Lipscomb County, Texas
Public high schools in Texas
Public middle schools in Texas
Public elementary schools in Texas